Barbara DuMetz (born 1947) is an American photographer and pioneer in the field of commercial photography.  She began working in Los Angeles as a commercial photographer in the 1970s, when very few women had established and maintained successful careers in the field, especially African-American women.
Over the course of her career, "she made a major contribution to diversifying the landscape of images that defined pop culture in the United States."

DuMetz is known for her work with African-American celebrities, corporations and images of everyday life in African-American communities. She has won three CEBA awards and a LULU award for her commercial photography.
Group shows have included her work in Atlanta, Chicago, Los Angeles and New York City. 
Retrospectives of her work have appeared at the Carl Van Vechten Gallery at Fisk University in 2014 and at Texas Southern University.

Early life
DuMetz was born in Charleston, West Virginia, the only girl and second of four children to Eustace T. DuMetz, II, DDS and Constance R. (née Brooks).  Her grandfather, Eustace DuMetz, was a free-lance photographer who worked for the Pittsburgh Courier and Charleston Gazette.

When DuMetz was five years old, her family moved to Detroit where she attended school, graduating from Central High School. She attended Fisk University in Nashville, Tennessee, majoring in Psychology.  After graduating from Fisk University in 1969, she attended the Art Center College of Design, now located in Pasadena, California.

Career
DuMetz has been a professional photographer for more than four decades.  Over the course of her career, she has produced award-winning images for advertising agencies 
including Burrell Advertising, J. P. Martin Associates and InterNorth Corporation.
Her photographs have appeared in African-American publications including Black Enterprise,
Ebony,
Essence,
Jet and The Crisis.
She has taken commercial photographs for corporations including The Coca-Cola Company, Delta Air Lines and McDonald's Corporation.

DuMetz ran and maintained three different photography studios located in the Los Angeles area where she was contracted by department stores, record companies, graphic design studios, advertising agencies, public relations firms, film production companies, actors and business professionals.
DuMetz's has shot photo layouts of celebrities and artists and personalities including 
Maya Angelou,
Ernie Barnes, 
Bernie Casey, 
Pam Grier,
Kareem Abdul-Jabbar, 
Quincy Jones,
Samella Lewis, 
Ed McMahan,
Thelonious Monk,
Lou Rawls,
Della Reese, 
Richard Roundtree,
Betye Saar, 
Charles Wilbert White, and
Nancy Wilson.
Her show The Creators: Photographic Images of Literary, Music and Visual Artists, at the Southwest Arts Center in Atlanta, Georgia, in 2015, included images of over two dozen African-American artists whom she has photographed.

References

External links 
Barbara DuMetz Photography
SWAC EXHIBITION: BARBARA DUMETZ, Fulton County Arts & Culture
http://www.artslant.com/global/artists/show/440456-barbara-dumetz "Barbara Dumetz"] at ArtSlant
"Barbara DuMetz Profile Video"

American women photographers
African-American photographers
American photographers
1947 births
Living people
People from Charleston, West Virginia
21st-century African-American people
21st-century African-American women
20th-century African-American people
20th-century African-American women